Banfora Airport  is a public use airport located 4 nm north-northeast of Banfora, Comoé, Burkina Faso.

See also
List of airports in Burkina Faso

References

External links 
 Official ASECNA Aeronautical Publication for Burkina Faso 
 Airport record for Banfora Airport at Landings.com (gives inaccurate position)

Airports in Burkina Faso
Comoé Province